Stan Getz Quartets is an album by saxophonist Stan Getz recorded at sessions in 1949 and 1950 and first released as an LP on the Prestige label in 1955.

Reception
AllMusic stated: "At the time, Getz's cool, Lester Young-inspired sound was becoming more distinct and harmonically varied, featuring the beautifully mellifluous tone he would soon turn into his trademark. Getz's airy approach is optimally heard on Quartets' many ballad standards".

Track listing
 "There's a Small Hotel" (Richard Rodgers, Lorenz Hart) - 2:56
 "I've Got You Under My Skin" (Cole Porter) - 3:16
 "What's New?" (Bob Haggart, Johnny Burke) - 3:21
 "Too Marvelous for Words" (Richard A. Whiting, Johnny Mercer) - 2:56
 "You Stepped Out of a Dream" (Nacio Herb Brown, Gus Kahn) - 2:54
 "My Old Flame" (Sam Coslow, Arthur Johnston) - 2:44
 "My Old Flame" [alternate take] (Coslow, Johnston) - 2:44 Bonus track on CD reissue
 "Long Island Sound" (Stan Getz) - 2:58
 "Indian Summer" (Victor Herbert, Al Dubin) - 2:50
 "Mar-Cia" (Getz) - 2:43
 "Crazy Chords" (Getz) - 2:36
 "The Lady in Red" (Allie Wrubel, Mort Dixon) - 3:16
 "The Lady in Red" [alternate take] (Wrubel, Dixon) - 3:17 Bonus track on CD reissue
 "Wrap Your Troubles in Dreams" (Harry Barris, Ted Koehler, Billy Moll) - 3:02
Recorded in New York City on June 21, 1949 (tracks 8-11), January 6, 1950 (tracks 1-4) and April 14, 1950 (tracks 5-7 & 12-14)

Personnel 
Stan Getz - tenor saxophone
Tony Aless (tracks 5-7 & 12-14), Al Haig (tracks 1-4 & 8-11) - piano
Percy Heath (tracks 5-7 & 12-14), Tommy Potter (tracks 1-4), Gene Ramey (tracks 8-11) - bass
Roy Haynes (tracks 1-4), Don Lamond (tracks 5-7 & 12-14), Stan Levey (tracks 8-11) - drums

References 

1955 albums
Stan Getz albums
Prestige Records albums
Albums produced by Bob Weinstock